Jonas Sonnenberg (born 23 June 1993) is a German footballer who plays as a centre-back for TB Bortfeld.

Career
Sonnenberg made his professional debut for TSV Havelse in the 3. Liga on 24 July 2021 against 1. FC Saarbrücken, coming on in the 88th minute as a substitute for Vico Meien.

References

External links
 
 
 
 

1993 births
Living people
People from Braunschweig
Footballers from Lower Saxony
German footballers
Association football defenders
VfL Wolfsburg II players
SSV Jahn Regensburg players
TSV Havelse players
3. Liga players
Regionalliga players